Soumbala may refer to:

Sumbala
Soumbala, Mali